Harvey Talbert White (March 3, 1938 – November 6, 2021) was an American collegiate and professional football quarterback who played for the American Football League's Boston Patriots. He was the first person to sign a Patriots contract on December 20, 1959. He played in three games for the Patriots in 1960.

See also
Other American Football League players

References

1938 births
2021 deaths
American football quarterbacks
Boston Patriots players
Clemson Tigers football players
American Football League players